The Valencian  National football team is the national football team for the Valencian Community, Spain. They are not affiliated with FIFA or UEFA, because it is represented internationally by the Spain national football team. It only plays friendly matches, and has not organised a fixture since 2006.

History
Historically, the Valencian team has had two well-differentiated periods: the time of the regional team, during which it faced other regional teams (1918-1944) and the time of the regional team, during which it faced six national A teams.

The Valencian football team made their debut against the South team on 19 November 1922 at the Campo de Algirós, in the quarter-finals of the 1922–23 Copa del Príncipe de Asturias, an official tournament organised by RFEF, and they lost 1-2. Eduardo Cubells was the author of the first goal in the history of the team. In the following edition of the Prince of Asturias Cup, the Valencian team played their second ever game, again against the South team, and again losing, this time 3-2, and also again Cubells was the author of Valencia's consolation goals, although some sources list Arturo Montesinos as the goalscorer of Valencia's second goal.

They had to wait 13 years for their first victory, when on 15 November 1936, they defied the expectations by defeating Catalonia by the incredible score of 4-0 at the Mestalla Stadium, thanks to braces from Severiano Goiburu and Langarita.

Matches played

Historic fixtures

The team also played matches against the leading club in the region, Valencia CF, five times in the 1930s and 40s and one in 1996.

Recent fixtures

Notable players
  Eduardo Cubells
  Arturo Montesinos
  Severiano Goiburu

Amateur team (UEFA Regions' Cup)
The Valencia amateur team is composed of Valencian players of Tercera División and lower divisions is in charge of defending the Valencian Country in the UEFA Regions' Cup. The team is made up of non-professional players, hence the team's name. With the new format disputed by regions, the Valencians have not classified to dispute the European fight in any occasion.

Access to the Regions Cup is decided in the Spanish stage of the UEFA Regions' Cup, where the Valencian team achieved its best result in 2008, when it was proclaimed the winner of Group F of the First Spanish Phase of the VI UEFA Regions' Cup. This preliminary phase of Group F was played between 7 and 9 December 2007 in the Valencian town of La Nucia (Marina Baixa), but then, in the Spanish Intermediate Phase, they lost to the Catalonia amateur team.

In December 2019, the Valencian amateur team played in the First Spanish Phase of the 12th edition of the UEFA Regions' Cup in Vícar, Almería. They drew 0-0 against Andalusia and lost 2-1 against Asturias.

See also
:Category:Footballers from the Valencian Community

References

External links 
List of matches in Roon Ba
 

Autonomous football team
European national and official selection-teams not affiliated to FIFA
Valencian Community